Junior Paramedics is a British television series that was first broadcast on BBC Three from 27 February to 8 April 2014. The series follows paramedics on a six-week placement with East Midlands Ambulance Service. The nine junior paramedics are Lucy Wright, Bryn Griffiths, Stephanie Cook, Lucy Mellor, Max Brufton, Amy Allen, Ashley Strawbridge, Victoria Hilditch, and Nick Bailey.

Production
The series was commissioned by Zai Bennett, controller of BBC Three, and Sean Hancock, the controller of entertainment commissioning. The executive producer is Ceri Aston. Sean Hancock said: "Junior Paramedics and No Country For Young Men both promise to be thought provoking and exciting series about young people in the UK trying to find their place in the world."

Episode list
Every episode is following the Junior Paramedics for one week of their six weeks placement. Episode 7 is a recap of the previous six episodes.

References

External links
 
 
 

2014 British television series debuts
2014 British television series endings
2010s British medical television series
Television shows set in the United Kingdom
BBC high definition shows
English-language television shows
BBC television documentaries
2010s British documentary television series